Paul the Apostle has been placed within Second Temple Judaism by recent scholarship since the 1970s. A main point of departure with older scholarship is the understanding of Second Temple Judaism; the covenant with God and the role of works as a means to either gain or keep the covenant.

A central concern for Paul was the inclusion of Gentiles into God's New Covenant, and the role of faith and commandments in the inclusion of Gentile converts. Paul did not deem circumcision necessary, as witnessed throughout his writings, but thought that God included Gentiles into his New Covenant through faith in Christ. This brought him into conflict with the Judaizers, a faction of the Jewish Christians who demanded strict observance of the Mosaic Law by Gentile Christians. Eventually the less strict view prevailed, and led to the separation of Gentile Christianity from Judaism.

Overview 

Paul's influence on Christian thinking is considered to be more significant than that of any other New Testament author. According to Krister Stendahl, the main concern of Paul's writings on Jesus' role, and salvation by faith, is not the individual conscience of human sinners, and their doubts about being chosen by God or not, but the problem of the inclusion of Gentile (Greek) Torah-observers into God's covenant.

Paul draws on several interpretative frames to solve this problem, but most importantly, his own experience and understanding. The kerygma from  refers to two mythologies: the Greek myth of the noble dead, to which the Maccabean notion of martyrdom and dying for one's people is related; and the Jewish myth of the persecuted sage or righteous man, c.q. the "story of the child of wisdom." The notion of 'dying for' refers to this martyrdom and persecution. 'Dying for our sins' refers to the problem of Gentile Torah-observers, who, despite their faithfulness, are not Jewish by birth, and are therefore 'sinners', excluded from God's covenant.

The inclusion of Gentiles into Judaism posed a problem for the Jewish-Christian identity of some of the proto-Christians, since the new converts did not follow all the tenets of the Mosaic Law; circumcision in particular was regarded as a token of the membership of the Abrahamic covenant, and the most traditionalist faction of Jewish Christians (i.e., converted Pharisees) insisted that Gentile converts had to be circumcised as well. Paul objected strongly to the insistence on keeping all of the Jewish commandments, considering it a great threat to his doctrine of salvation through faith in Jesus. According to Paula Fredriksen, Paul's opposition to male circumcision for Gentiles is in line with the Old Testament predictions that "in the last days the gentile nations would come to the God of Israel, as gentiles (e.g.), not as proselytes to Israel." For Paul, Gentile male circumcision was therefore an affront to God's intentions. According to Larry Hurtado, "Paul saw himself as what Munck called a salvation-historical figure in his own right", who was "personally and singularly deputized by God to bring about the predicted ingathering (the “fullness”) of the nations."

For Paul, the sacrifice of Jesus solved the problem of the exclusion of Gentiles from God's covenant, since the faithful are redeemed by participation in Jesus' death and rising. Hurtado notes that Paul valued the linkage with "Jewish Christian circles in Roman Judea", which makes it likely that his Christology was in line with, and indebted to, their views. Hurtado further notes that "[i]t is widely accepted that the tradition that Paul recites in  must go back to the Jerusalem Church."

New Perspective on Paul 

E. P. Sanders introduced a new perspective on Paul with his 1977 publication Paul and Palestinian Judaism. According to Sanders, Western theology has misunderstood the Judaic context of Paul's religious views. Law-keeping and good works were not means to enter the covenant (legalism), but a sign of being in, and a means of keeping, the covenant. Sanders called this pattern of religion "covenantal nomism". Sanders' perspective calls the traditional Protestant understanding of the doctrine of justification into serious question.

Sanders' publications, such as Paul and Palestinian Judaism in 1977 and Paul, the Law, and the Jewish People in 1983, have since been taken up by Professor James D. G. Dunn, who coined the phrase "New Perspective on Paul";<ref>J.D.G. Dunn's Manson Memorial Lecture (4.11.1982): 'The New Perspective on Paul' BJRL 65 (1983), 95–122.</ref> and by N. T. Wright, then Anglican bishop of Durham. Wright notes the apparent discrepancy between Romans and Galatians, the former being much more positive about the continuing covenantal relationship between God and his ancient people than the latter. Wright contends therefore that works are not insignificant. According to Wright, Paul distinguishes between works which are signs of ethnic identity, and those which are a sign of obedience to Christ.

Within the last three decades, a number of theologians have put forward other "New Perspectives" on Paul's doctrine of justification, and even more specifically on what he says about justification by faith. According to Simon Gathercole, "Justification by faith" means God accepts Gentiles in addition to Jews, since both believe in God. Paul writes in his letter to the Romans, "For we maintain that a man is justified by faith apart from observing the law. Is God the God of Jews only? Is he not the God of Gentiles too? Yes, of Gentiles too, since there is only one God, who will justify the circumcised by faith and the uncircumcised through that same faith". Faith is the central component of Paul's doctrine of justification — meaning that Gentiles don't need to become Israelites when they convert to Christianity, because God is not just the God of one nation, but Gentile and Jew alike.

Sources

The Book of Acts contains an account of Paul's travels and deeds, his conflicts with Greeks and Jews during the Julio-Claudian dynasty, and his interactions with the original Apostles of Jesus. The value of the historical information in Acts, however, is challenged by some scholars. They believe that it was written from a perspective of reconciliation between Pauline Christianity and its opponents, so portrays Paul as a Law-abiding Jew and omits his dispute with Peter, only briefly mentioning the split with Barnabas. Irenaeus in the 2nd century was the first of record to quote Acts, and he used it against Marcion of Sinope, who rejected the Hebrew Bible entirely (see also Marcionism).

Paul's background

Jewish background

Paul was from a devout Jewish family based in the city of Tarsus, one of the largest trade centers on the Mediterranean coast. It had been in existence several hundred years prior to his birth. It was renowned for its university. During the time of Alexander the Great, who died in 323 BC, Tarsus was the most influential city in Asia Minor.

Paul's family had a history of religious piety. Apparently the family lineage had been very attached to Pharisaic traditions and observances for generations; Acts quotes Paul referring to his family by saying he was "a Pharisee, born of Pharisees". In  he states that two of his relatives, Andronicus and Junia, were Christians before he was and were prominent among the Apostles. Acts says that he was an artisan involved in the leather or tent-making profession. This was to become an initial connection with Priscilla and Aquila, with whom he would partner in tent-making and later become very important teammates as fellow missionaries. Paul referred to himself as an observant Jew in the letter to the Philippians:

While he was still fairly young, he was sent to Jerusalem to receive rabbinical education at the school of Gamaliel, one of the most noted rabbis in history. Some of his family may have resided in Jerusalem, since later the son of one of his sisters saved his life there. Nothing more is known of his biography until he takes an active part in the martyrdom of Stephen, a Hellenised diaspora Jew.

Although we know from his biography and from Acts that Paul could speak Hebrew, modern scholarship suggests that Koine Greek was his first language.Dale Martin (2009), Introduction to New Testament History and Literature, lecture 14: "Paul as Missionary". Yale University. In his letters, Paul drew heavily on his knowledge of Stoic philosophy, using Stoic terms and metaphors to assist his new Gentile converts in their understanding of the Gospel and to explain his Christology.

Greek backgroundHellenistic Judaism was a movement which existed in the Jewish diaspora and the Holy Land that sought to establish a Hebraic-Jewish religious tradition within the culture and language of Hellenism. The major literary product of the contact of Judaism and Hellenistic culture is the Septuagint (begun in the 3rd century BC). Major authors are Philo of Alexandria (died c. 50 AD), Josephus (died c.100 AD), and some would claim also Paul. The decline of Hellenistic Judaism in the 2nd century AD is obscure. It may be that it was marginalized by, absorbed into, or became Early Christianity.

Recently, Talmudic scholar Daniel Boyarin has argued that Paul's theology of the spirit is more deeply rooted in Hellenistic Judaism than generally believed. In A Radical Jew, Boyarin argues that Paul the Apostle combined the life of Jesus with Greek philosophy to reinterpret the Hebrew Bible in terms of the Platonic opposition between the ideal (which is real) and the material (which is false).

Gentiles and circumcision

Before Paul's conversion, Christianity was part of Second Temple Judaism. Gentiles who wished to join the early Christian movement, which at the time comprised mostly Jewish followers, were expected to convert to Judaism, which likely meant submission to adult male circumcision for the uncircumcised, following the dietary restrictions of kashrut, and more. During the time period there were also "partial converts", such as gate proselytes and God-fearers, i.e. Greco-Roman sympathizers which made an allegiance to Judaism but refused to convert and therefore retained their Gentile (non-Jewish) status, hence they were uncircumcised and it wasn't required for them to follow any of the commandments of the Mosaic Law. Paul insisted that faith in Christ (see also Faith or Faithfulness) was sufficient for salvation, therefore the Mosaic Law wasn't binding for the Gentiles.

Paul's conversion
The Epistle to the Galatians says that, prior to his conversion, Paul was a Pharisee who "violently persecuted" the followers of Jesus.

Pillars of the Church
 says that after God "called me...so that I might proclaim him among the Gentiles", he "did not confer with any human being". When he was in Jerusalem three years later he met Cephas (Peter) and James the Lord’s brother and  says he did not explain "the gospel that I proclaim among the Gentiles" to "the acknowledged leaders" until 14 years later in a subsequent trip to Jerusalem.

Proselytizing among Jews
According to Acts, Paul began working along the traditional Jewish line of proselytizing in the various synagogues where the proselytes of the gate and the Jews met; and only because he failed to win the Jews to his views, encountering strong opposition and persecution from them, did he turn to the Gentile world after he had agreed at a convention with the apostles at Jerusalem to admit the Gentiles into the Church only as proselytes of the gate, that is, after their acceptance of the Noachian laws.

In , Paul declares that, immediately after his conversion, he went away into Arabia, and again returned to Damascus. "Then after three years, I went up to Jerusalem to visit Cephas". In Acts, no mention is made of Paul's journey into Arabia; and the journey to Jerusalem is placed immediately after the notice of Paul's preaching in the synagogues. Hilgenfeld, Wendt, Weizäcker, Weiss, and others allege here a contradiction between the writer of the Acts and Paul.

Rabbi Jacob Emden, in a remarkable apology for Christianity contained in his appendix to Seder Olam Rabbah, gives as his opinion that the original intention of Jesus, and especially of Paul, was to convert only the Gentiles to the seven moral laws of Noah and to let the Jews follow the Mosaic law, which explains the apparent contradictions in the New Testament regarding the laws of Moses and the Sabbath.

Persecution of Paul by Jews in Acts

Several passages in Acts describe Paul's missions to Asia Minor and the encounters he had with Diaspora Jews and with local gentile populations. In , the Jews from Antioch and Iconium go so far as to follow Paul to other cities and to incite the crowds there to violence against him. Paul had already been stoned and left for dead once. In Philippi, a Roman colony, Roman magistrates beat and jailed Paul and his companions on behalf of the Gentiles. Clearly at this point, Paul and his companions were still considered to be Jews by those in Philippi who raised protests against them, despite Paul's attempts to tailor his teachings to his audience. Later, in nearby Thessalonica, the Jews again incited the crowds and pitted the Christians against the Roman authority.

Circumcision controversy

Paul, who called himself "Apostle to the Gentiles",, ; ; ; . criticised the practice of circumcision, perhaps as an entrance into the New Covenant of Jesus. In the case of Timothy, whose mother was a Jewish Christian but whose father was a Greek, Paul personally circumcised him "because of the Jews" that were in town. In  he also disputes the value of circumcision.

Paul made his case to the Christians at Rome that circumcision no longer meant the physical, but a spiritual practice. And in that sense, he wrote: "Is any man called being circumcised? Let him not become uncircumcised" in —probably a reference to the practice of epispasm.Catholic Encyclopedia: Circumcision: "To this epispastic operation performed on the athletes to conceal the marks of circumcision St. Paul alludes, me epispastho ." Paul was already circumcised at the time of his conversion. He added: "Is any called in uncircumcision? Let him not be circumcised", and went on to argue that circumcision didn't matter: "Circumcision is nothing and uncircumcision is nothing. Keeping God's commands is what counts."

Later Paul more explicitly denounced the practice, rejecting and condemning those Judaizers who promoted circumcision to Gentile Christians. He accused them of turning from the Spirit to the flesh: "Are you so foolish, that, whereas you began in the Spirit, you would now be made perfect by the flesh?" Paul warned that the advocates of circumcision were "false brothers". He accused the advocates of circumcision of wanting to make a good showing in the flesh, and of glorying or boasting of the flesh. Paul instead stressed a message of salvation through faith in Christ opposed to the submission under the Mosaic Law that constituted a New Covenant with God, which essentially provides a justification for Gentiles from the harsh edicts of the Law, a New Covenant that didn't require circumcision (see also Justification by faith, Pauline passages supporting antinomianism, Abrogation of Old Covenant laws).

However, such apparent discrepancies have led to a degree of skepticism about the reliability of Acts. Some believe that Paul wrote the entire Epistle to the Galatians attacking circumcision, saying in chapter five: "Behold, I Paul say unto you, if ye be circumcised, Christ shall profit you nothing."

The division between the Jews who followed the Mosaic Law and were circumcised and the Gentiles who were uncircumcised was highlighted in his Epistle to the Galatians:

Views on Judaizers

The Judaizers were a faction of the Jewish Christians, both of Jewish and non-Jewish origins, who regarded the Levitical laws of the Old Testament as still binding on all Christians. They tried to enforce Jewish circumcision upon the Gentile converts to early Christianity and were strenuously opposed and criticized for their behavior by the Apostle Paul, which employed many of his epistles to refute their doctrinal errors.

Paul was severely critical of the Judaizers within the Early Church and harshly reprimanded them for their doctrines and behavior. This conflict between Paul and his opponents may have been the reason for the Council of Jerusalem.  Here James, Paul, and the other leaders of the Early Christian movement agreed that Gentile converts needed only to follow the "three exceptions", (counted by some as four) laws that roughly coincide with Judaism's Seven Laws of Noah said to be established by God for all humankind. This Apostolic Decree, still observed by the Eastern Orthodox Church, is similar to that adopted by Rabbinic Judaism, which teaches that Gentiles need only follow the Noachide Laws to be assured of a place in the World to Come (see also Noahidism and Dual-covenant theology).

Council of Jerusalem

Paul seems to have refused "to be tied down to particular patterns of behavior and practice."  He does not engage in a dispute with those Corinthians who apparently feel quite free to eat anything offered to idols, never appealing or even mentioning the Jerusalem council. He rather attempts to persuade them by appealing to the care they should have for other believers who might not feel so free.

Paul himself described several meetings with the apostles in Jerusalem, though it is difficult to reconcile any of them fully with the account in Acts (see also Paul the Apostle#Council of Jerusalem). Paul claims he "went up again to Jerusalem" (i.e., not the first time) with Barnabas and Titus "in response to a revelation", in order to "lay before them the gospel proclaimed among the Gentiles", them being according to Paul "those who were supposed to be acknowledged leaders": James, Cephas and John. He describes this as a "private meeting" (not a public council) and notes that Titus, who was Greek, wasn't pressured to be circumcised.  However, he refers to "false believers secretly brought in, who slipped in to spy on the freedom we have in Christ Jesus, so that they might enslave us."

Paul claims the "pillars" of the Church had no differences with him. On the contrary, they gave him the "right hand of fellowship", he bound for the mission to "the uncircumcised" and they to "the circumcised", requesting only that he remember the "poor". Whether this was the same meeting as that described in Acts is not universally agreed.

According to an article in the Jewish Encyclopedia, great as was the success of Barnabas and Paul in the heathen world, the authorities in Jerusalem insisted upon circumcision as the condition of admission of members into the church, until, on the initiative of Peter, and of James, the head of the Jerusalem church, it was agreed that acceptance of the Noachian Laws — namely, regarding avoidance of idolatry, fornication, and the eating of flesh cut from a living animal — should be demanded of the heathen desirous of entering the Church.

Since F.C. Baur, scholars have found evidence of various strands of thought within Early Christianity. James D. G. Dunn proposes that Peter was a "bridge-man" between the opposing views of Paul and James the Just.

Incident at Antioch

Despite the agreement presumably achieved at the Council of Jerusalem as understood by Paul, Paul recounts how he later publicly confronted Peter, also called the "Incident at Antioch" over Peter's reluctance to share a meal with Gentile Christians in Antioch.

Writing later of the incident, Paul recounts: "I opposed [Peter] to his face, because he was clearly in the wrong".  Paul reports that he told Peter: "You are a Jew, yet you live like a Gentile and not like a Jew. How is it, then, that you force Gentiles to follow Jewish customs?"  Paul also mentions that even Barnabas (his travelling companion and fellow apostle until that time) sided with Peter.

The final outcome of the incident remains uncertain.  The Catholic Encyclopedia states: "St. Paul's account of the incident leaves no doubt that St. Peter saw the justice of the rebuke." In contrast, L. Michael White's From Jesus to Christianity states: "The blowup with Peter was a total failure of political bravado, and Paul soon left Antioch as persona non grata, never again to return."

The primary source for the Incident at Antioch is Paul's letter to the Galatians.

Jews depicted as killers of Jesus
As noted by New Testament scholar Pieter Willem van der Horst, Paul accuses the Jews of killing Jesus and the prophets in :

James P. Carroll,  historian and former Catholic priest, cautions that this and similar statements in the Gospels of Matthew and John are properly viewed as "evidence not of Jew hatred but of sectarian conflicts among Jews" in the early years of the Christian church.

Separation with Judaism

Paul's theology of the gospel contributed to the separation of the messianic sect of Christians from Judaism, a development contrary to Paul's own intent. He wrote that faith in Christ was alone decisive in salvation for Jews and Gentiles alike, making the schism between the followers of Christ and mainstream Jews inevitable and permanent. Without Paul's campaign against the legalists who opposed him, Christianity may have remained a dissenting sect within Judaism.

He argued that Gentile converts did not need to follow Jewish customs, get circumcised, follow Jewish dietary restrictions, or otherwise observe Mosaic law'' in order to have a share in the world to come.  Teaching them to forsake idolatry for Noahidism, he insisted in his Epistle to the Romans on the positive value of the Law (see also Pauline passages opposing antinomianism) in its divine form.  Since Paul's time, the polemical contrast that he made between the old and the new way of salvation has usually been weakened, with an emphasis on smooth development (Supersessionism) rather than stark contrast (Marcionism). See also New Perspective on Paul.

(see also Antinomianism in the New Testament and Abrogation of Old Covenant laws)

Pauline Christianity

Pauline Christianity is a term used to refer to a branch of Early Christianity associated with the beliefs and doctrines espoused by Paul the Apostle through his writings. The term is generally considered a pejorative by some who believe it carries the implication that Christianity as it is known is a corruption of the original teachings of Jesus, as in the doctrine of the Great Apostasy.

Jewish views

Jewish historical reconstructions
Jewish interest in Paul is a recent phenomenon. Before the so-called Jewish reclamation of Jesus (as a Jew) in the eighteenth and nineteenth centuries, he had hardly featured in the popular Jewish imagination and little had been written about him by the religious leaders and scholars. Arguably, he is absent from the Talmud and rabbinical literature, although he makes an appearance in some variants of the medieval polemic Toledot Yeshu (as a spy for the rabbis). But with Jesus no longer regarded as the paradigm of gentile Christianity, Paul's position became more important in Jewish historical reconstructions of their religion's relationship with Christianity. He has featured as the key to building barriers (e.g. Heinrich Graetz and Martin Buber) or bridges (e.g. Isaac Mayer Wise and Claude G. Montefiore) in interfaith relations, as part of an intra-Jewish debate about what constitutes Jewish authenticity (e.g. Joseph Klausner and Hans Joachim Schoeps), and, on occasion, as a dialogical partner (e.g. Richard L. Rubenstein and Daniel Boyarin). He features in an oratorio (by Felix Mendelssohn), a painting (by Ludwig Meidner) and a play (by Franz Werfel), and there have been several novels about Paul (by Shalom Asch and Samuel Sandmel). Jewish philosophers (including Baruch Spinoza, Leo Shestov, and Jacob Taubes) and Jewish psychoanalysts (including Sigmund Freud and Hanns Sachs) have engaged with the apostle as one of the most influential figures in Western thought. Scholarly surveys of Jewish interest in Paul include those by Hagner (1980), Meissner (1996), and Langton (2010, 2011).

See also
 Anti-Judaism
 Apostolic Age
 Biblical law in Christianity
 Christianity in the 1st century
 Relations between early Christianity and Judaism

Notes

References

Citations

Sources 
Printed sources

 

 

 
 
 

 

 
 

 

 

 
 
 

 
 

 

Web sources

External links
 Jewish Encyclopedia: Saul of Tarsus
 Jewish Encyclopedia: Antinomianism: Paulinism and Pharisaism

New Testament theology
Bible-related controversies
1st-century Christianity
Judaism
Judaism in the New Testament
Ancient Christian controversies
Ancient Christian antisemitism
Hellenism and Christianity
Mosaic law in Christian theology
Hellenistic Judaism